Tyrone Deon Mings (born 13 March 1993) is an English professional footballer who plays as a centre-back for  club Aston Villa and the England national team.

Mings started his career playing non-League football with Yate Town, having previously been at the Southampton academy for eight years. He joined Southern League Premier Division club Chippenham Town in 2012. Mings signed for Ipswich Town in December 2012 and made his Football League debut on the final day of the 2012–13 season. He spent a further two seasons with Ipswich, before joining AFC Bournemouth in 2015, going on to make his Premier League debut in August 2015. He joined Aston Villa on loan for the remainder of the 2018–19 season in January 2019, helping the club win promotion to the Premier League through the Championship play-offs. Mings signed permanently for Aston Villa in July 2019.

Mings received his first call up to the senior England squad in August 2019. He made his senior debut in October 2019. In June 2021, Mings was selected for the England squad for the UEFA Euro 2020 tournament.

Club career

Early career
Mings was born in Bath, Avon to former non-League striker Adie Mings. Mings joined Southampton in 2001 as an eight-year-old, but was released in 2009 when the youth budget was axed. After leaving Southampton, he attended Millfield school in Somerset for two years on a football scholarship. Having graduated, Mings featured for Eastleigh FC in a trial match against the Falkland Islands but was not offered a contract. Mings then signed for non-League club Yate Town in Gloucestershire. In the summer of 2012, he considered quitting football before eventually signing for Southern League Premier Division club Chippenham Town, representing the town he grew up in. Mings combined his non-League career with jobs as a barman and a mortgage advisor.

Ipswich Town
Mings signed for Ipswich Town in December 2012 after a short trial for a fee of £10,000 and an agreement for Ipswich to play a pre-season friendly game against Chippenham. On 4 May 2013, Mings made his debut for Ipswich on the last day of the 2012–13 season against Burnley. He went into the 2013–14 season as the back up left-back behind Aaron Cresswell, although he did start the opening game of the season due to Cresswell's suspension. On 4 January 2014, Mings started an FA Cup tie against Preston North End at right-back instead of his usual left-back role. He made 18 appearances during the season, making 6 starts and 12 substitute appearances.

Following Aaron Cresswell's transfer to West Ham United in July 2014, Mings was handed the number 3 shirt. Because of this, Mings offered to purchase new shirts for two fans who had bought shirts with his old number 15 printed on the back. On transfer deadline day in summer 2014, Mings was the subject of a £3 million bid from Crystal Palace which was rejected by Ipswich. On 20 September 2014, Mings signed a new three-year contract with Ipswich.

Mings started the 2014–15 season as the starting left-back, starting on the opening day of the season in a 2–1 win against Fulham. He continued to feature as a key part of the team throughout the season. On 10 October 2014, Mings won the Championship Player of the Month award for September. He scored his first goal for the club on 24 February 2015, netting the opening goal in a 4–2 home win over Birmingham City at Portman Road. Mings made 44 appearances in all competitions over the course of the season, scoring once, helping Ipswich to reach the Championship play-offs.

AFC Bournemouth
On 26 June 2015, Mings signed for newly promoted Premier League club AFC Bournemouth on a four-year contract for an undisclosed fee, reported to be £8 million.

Mings made his Premier League debut for Bournemouth on 29 August 2015 in a 1–1 draw with Leicester City. However, he suffered a knee injury six minutes after coming on as a half-time substitute. On 3 September 2015, it was confirmed that Mings' injury would mean that he would be sidelined for between 9 and 12 months. On 13 December 2016, he made his comeback after 15 months as a late substitute in a 1–0 home win over defending champions Leicester City, the same opponent when he got injured in his debut.

On 8 March 2017, Mings was banned by the FA for five matches following an alleged stamp on Zlatan Ibrahimović in a 1–1 draw against Manchester United on the previous weekend.

Aston Villa
On 31 January 2019, Mings joined Aston Villa on loan for the rest of the season. He made his Villa debut on 2 February against Reading. The match was the subject of controversy following an incident where Mings stepped on the face of Reading forward Nélson Oliveira after a tussle for the ball. Oliveira was forced off with deep gashes to his forehead and nose. Mings later apologised, insisting that it was not intentional. As referee Geoff Eltringham had seen the incident and determined that it was accidental, no retrospective action was taken.

Mings scored his first Aston Villa goal in his second game, on 8 February 2019. He scored in the 82nd minute of the home game against Sheffield United. At that point, Aston Villa had been losing 3–0, but they went on to complete a late comeback to draw the game 3–3. Despite Villa's poor run of form at that time, Mings was a standout performer and quickly became a fan favourite despite only recently arriving from Bournemouth. Villa had a change in form after the return of Jack Grealish from injury, during which Villa picked up a 10-game winning streak, in the fifth of which Mings scored the winning goal in a 2–1 win over Blackburn Rovers. On 27 May 2019, Mings played in the 2018–19 EFL Championship Play-off Final, where he helped Villa to defeat Derby County 2–1, and gain promotion to the Premier League.

Mings signed for Aston Villa permanently on 8 July 2019. The fee was believe to be an initial £20million, with add-ons that could total £25million.

After the UK government announced resumption of sports and Premier League announced the return of teams as part of "Project Restart" from 17 June, Mings claimed that the players were the last to be consulted and were only treated as "commodities in the game".

On 21 September 2020, Mings signed a new four-year contract with Aston Villa. Following the departure of former captain Jack Grealish, Mings was announced as the new captain of Aston Villa on 14 August 2021, having served as interim captain during Grealish's injury in the second half of the 2020–21 season.

On 27 July 2022, it was announced that Aston Villa manager Steven Gerrard had made the decision to remove the captaincy from Mings for the upcoming season, instead naming John McGinn as the new captain. Gerrard stated that the decision would allow Mings to focus on his own game without the added pressure of being captain, whereas Mings commented that he had no issues with the choice and only wanted what was best for Aston Villa.

International career
As well as being eligible for England, Mings was also eligible for Barbados through his paternal grandparents. His father Adie turned down a call-up from Barbados during his own playing career. Mings received his first England call-up in August 2019 when he was announced as part of the squad for the UEFA Euro 2020 qualifiers against Bulgaria and Kosovo. Mings earned his first senior England cap, in a 0–6 win away to Bulgaria, in October 2019, playing the entire match. The match was overshadowed by racist chants from Bulgarian fans, which was reported by Mings to captain Harry Kane who then reported it to the referee. This activated standard UEFA protocol, which largely put a stop to the chanting.

In June 2021, Mings was selected for the England squad for the UEFA Euro 2020 tournament. He started the opening group match of the tournament, helping England keep a clean sheet in a 1–0 win against Croatia on 13 June at Wembley. He also started the following match against Scotland on 18 June, again helping England keep a clean sheet in a 0–0 draw. He came on as a second-half substitute in the final group match in a 1–0 win against the Czech Republic on 22 June, as England finished top of Group D, qualifying for the knockout stages as a result.

Following England's defeat on penalties in the final to Italy, three England players Marcus Rashford, Jadon Sancho, and Bukayo Saka suffered online racist abuse after they had missed in the shootout. Home Secretary Priti Patel tweeted that she was "disgusted" by it. Mings then replied to her on Twitter accusing her of encouraging the racist behaviour of supporters after she had previously denounced the players' anti-racism message of taking the knee before kick-off as "gesture politics", and that supporters had a right to boo it. Mings' full tweet read: "You don't get to stoke the fire at the beginning of the tournament by labelling our anti-racism message as 'Gesture Politics' & then pretend to be disgusted when the very thing we're campaigning against, happens."

On 15 November 2021, Mings scored his first international goal, in a 10–0 away 2022 FIFA World Cup qualification victory over San Marino.

Personal life
Mings is the son of Adie Mings, a former striker with non-League Bath City and Gloucester City who currently works as a scout for Manchester City.

Off the field, Ipswich Town's Supporters' Club praised Mings for his charitable works. He spent Christmas Day 2013 feeding homeless people and when he was given the number three shirt by Ipswich at the beginning of the 2014–15 season, he replaced the shirts of fans who had already bought ones with his old number on the back. Mings started his own youth footballing academy called The Tyrone Mings Academy that is based in Birmingham, England. It is aimed at children aged 6 to 16.

Outside of football, Mings has a business interest in an interior design company in Bournemouth.

Career statistics

Club

International

England score listed first, score column indicates score after each Mings goal

Honours
Aston Villa
EFL Championship play-offs: 2019
EFL Cup runner-up: 2019–20

England
UEFA European Championship runner-up: 2020

Individual
Football League Championship Player of the Month: September 2014

References

External links

Profile at the Aston Villa F.C. website
Profile at the Football Association website

1993 births
Living people
Sportspeople from Bath, Somerset
English footballers
England international footballers
Association football defenders
Southampton F.C. players
Yate Town F.C. players
Chippenham Town F.C. players
Ipswich Town F.C. players
AFC Bournemouth players
Aston Villa F.C. players
Southern Football League players
English Football League players
Premier League players
UEFA Euro 2020 players
Black British sportspeople
English sportspeople of Barbadian descent
People educated at Millfield